Harry Walters may refer to:

Harry N. Walters, American businessman, administrator of US Army affairs in the Reagan administration 
Harry Walters (photographer), Ipswich, England 
Harry Walters (Canadian football), Canadian football player